George Harvie Burpo (June 19, 1922 – December 20, 2015) was a professional baseball player. He was a left-handed pitcher who made two appearances in 1946 for the Cincinnati Reds. For his career, he did not record a decision, with a 15.43 earned run average and one strikeout in 2 innings pitched.

Early life and education
Burpo served three years in the United States Navy at Naval Air Technical Training Center, Norman, Oklahoma during the World War II and received an honorable discharge in December 1945.

References

External links

1922 births
2015 deaths
Cincinnati Reds players
Major League Baseball pitchers
Baseball players from Kentucky
Muskogee Reds players
Tucson Cowboys players
Birmingham Barons players
Syracuse Chiefs players
Columbia Reds players
Tulsa Oilers (baseball) players
People from Jenkins, Kentucky
United States Navy personnel of World War II
United States Navy sailors